Rediske Air was a small air taxi charter airline operating out of Alaska.

History 
Rediske Air was formed in 1991. It was started by Charlie Rediske, a local pilot. In 2001, Charlie Rediske died, and his son Walter and his daughter Lyla became chief operators of the airline. As of 2017, the airline's website was no longer working.

Fleet 

 6 de Havilland Canada DHC-3 Otter
 Britten-Norman BN-2 Islander
 Cessna 207

Accidents and incidents 
 On July 7, 2013, a Rediske Air DHC-3 Otter plane crashed in Soldotna Airport, Soldotna, Alaska, killing all ten people on board, including Walter Rediske and two families who were on vacation from Greenville, South Carolina.

See also 
 List of defunct airlines of the United States

References

External links 
 Official website from Archive.org

Airlines established in 1991
Airlines disestablished in 2017
Defunct charter airlines of the United States
Defunct companies based in Alaska
1991 establishments in Alaska
2017 disestablishments in Alaska
Airlines based in Alaska